, contracted as "" for short, is a series of popular Pachinko games (slot machines) set in Halloween and developed by Konami, specifically its division KPE. The Series began publication in 2007, and so far consists of ten titles:
  (July 2007)
  (March 2009)
  (January 2010)
  (September 2011)
  (November 2013)
  (May 2014) (Re-release of Magical Halloween 4)
  (February 2016)
  (March 2018)
  (December 2019)
  (September 2021)

all of which have only been released in Japan.

Characters 

Voiced by: Yui Horie
   The main character of the games. She is a 17-year-old apprentice witch who still can not use magic very well.

    The Familiar of Alice. Due to a failed summoning ritual, seems to have turned into an incomplete form by mistake.

    Organisms from ancient times that settled in Alice's house. It true identity is unknown, but exert a special power at night of Halloween.

Voiced by: Michie Tomizawa
    Nicknamed Rose. Alice's rival.

    Senior monster contracted with Rose. Contract is with the remuneration of dating Rose once a month.

    One of three people that are summoned by Alice.

    One of three people that are summoned by Alice.

    One of three people that are summoned by Alice.

Voiced by: Sanae Kobayashi
    Clerk of the magic shop. Appear in the production shops.

External links 
 Official For Website Magical Halloween (KPE Inc.) (in Japanese)
 Official Website Magical For Halloween R (KPE Inc.) (in Japanese)
 Official Website Magical For Halloween 2 (KPE Inc.) (in Japanese)
 Official Website For Magical Halloween 3 (KPE Inc.) (in Japanese)
 Official Website For Magical Halloween 4 (KPE Inc.) (in Japanese)
 Official Website For Magical Halloween 5 (KPE Inc.) (in Japanese)
 Official Website For Magical Halloween 6 (Konami) (in Japanese)

Konami games
iOS games